N K Bansal (Narendra Kumar Bansal)  (December 1943 – February 2020) was a former Head and Senior Professor of Centre for Energy Studies at IIT-Delhi. He was also the Vice-Chancellor of a technical university SMVDU in Jammu and Kashmir. Bansal was the recipient of the fellowship of the German Academic Exchange Service as well holder of Alexander von Humboldt Fellowship from Germany. N.K Bansal work on Climatic Zones and Passive Building Design is used extensively by researchers and practitioners.

Early life and education 

Narendra Kumar Bansal was born to Om Prakash Gupta and Prem Lata on 11 December 1943 to a family of academicians.  His father was a retired teacher and his mother established a school to teach young kids. He was one of seven kids 4 boys, two girls and one adopted sibling. Bansal's wife was Shaila Bansal who died in October 2019 and they are survived by three daughters.

At age of 13, Narendra Kumar Bansal was already doing 11th grade and by 15 years he had graduated high school. Bansal went to Banaras Hindu University to earn a medical degree. However, due to an autoimmune disorder, he had to leave the program and was hospitalized in All India Medical Institute (AIIMS) in Delhi for a year. Despite this setback, he went on to complete his Bachelor's in Science (BSC) degree from Agra University at the age of 20 years. He went on to complete his Master's in Science (MSC) degree from Indian Institute of Technology Delhi in 1966 and Doctorate (Ph.D.) in Physics from Indian Institute of Technology Delhi in 1969.

He was a champion in badminton and table tennis and loved to play pranks on his siblings. He was known for his good sense of humor in the family.

Academic career
In 1970, Narendra Kumar Bansal joined St. Stephen College, University of Delhi as a Lecturer.  However, he proceeded to Germany in the year 1975 for his post-doctoral work in the field of Nuclear Energy. On his return, Bansal shifted his activities to the Renewable Energy applications, Energy Efficiency in Buildings and Energy Planning Models (DOE2 building simulation program) and environmental systems.

Bansal joined the Centre of Energy studies at Indian Institute of Technology Delhi in the year 1979 and was elevated to the post of Chief Scientific Officer (1988) and Professor (1991). He served as the head of the Centre of Energy Studies, during the period 1997-1999 before finally retiring from Indian Institute of Technology Delhi. During his period at Indian Institute of Technology Delhi, Bansal made extensive contributions to the developments of curriculum, laboratories and collaborative National and International Projects.

Legacy
Bansal has a vast experience spanning over 41 years of teaching and R&D work in the field of Renewable Energy. He is the author and editor of more than 20 books, 16 reviews and more than 300 publications in International Journals of high repute. Bansal has guided 35 students for their PHD and 40 students for their MTech degree and a number of international students. Bansal has lectured extensively in Germany, USA, UK and Sweden. His works on Climatic Zones and Passive building design is used extensively by researchers and practitioners in India and abroad. He has been a consultant to US AID, German Technical Cooperation Society and industries in India and abroad. He has been a member of Scientific Advisory Committee of a German State as well as a board member of Solar-Institut Jülich, Germany and on the advisory board member of a European project on future climate coordinated by Demark Engineering Association.

Bansal is regarded as the top 2% scientist in the world based on an independent study done by Stanford University Scientists. His research work and several projects he coordinated, speak volumes for his extensive contribution to the field of Energy.

His associations with Germany, where he was six times full professor, is exemplary. He is the holder of prestigious Alexander Von Humboldt fellowship, and has also guided many international students especially from Germany, who still rejoiced association with him until his death.

Shri Mata Vaishno Devi University
On 15 November 2004, the Governor of Jammu and Kashmir invited Narendra Kumar Bansal to further the establishment of a new university, Shri Mata Vaishno Devi University, Katra, J&K, India. Professor Bansal joined as Vice Chancellor and showed visionary approach to establish the university as a residential campus on the same model as Indian Institute of Technology (IIT).  In a short period of time, Bansal took the enormous challenge of building a highly technical and fully residential University efficiently and with great success. During his tenure until 2009, the university achieved national and international recognition. Narendra Kumar Bansal started various programs in the discipline of Science, Management, Energy, Humanities and Social Sciences. Bansal also established the building and capital infrastructure in record time in order to house the various programs, teachers and students in the university. He was very well known for his hard work, iron, will and integrity in running the university. Gen Sinha in his book Guarding India's integrity has described Bansal as a man of tremendous drive, dedication and vision. According to him. the credit of translating his dream of establishing world class technical University goes to Prof. Bansal. Upon Narendra Bansal's death, a vigil was held in his remembrance in the central courtyard of the university.

Awards 
Bansal has been a recipient of Dr. C M Jacob Gold Medal (1991 Chennai) of the Systems Society of India, Pioneer in Renewable Energy (1996 Florence Italy) by World Renewable Energy Network, He also received Rajiv Gandhi Shiromani Award and lifetime achievement award for excellence in education as well as Amity Excellence Award. Below is the list:

Dr. C. M. Jacob Gold Medal (System Society of India, 1991)
Pioneer in Renewable Energy (WREN 1996, Florence, Italy)
Solar Pioneer from India (German magazine 2004)
Life Time Achievement Award in Education (2005)
Rajiv Gandhi Shiromani Award
Amity Excellence Award (2008)
Holder of Alexander Von Humboldt Fellowship and DAAD Fellowship of Germany.

Industrial experience 
Professor Bansal always had a very close cooperation with industries and with several National and International Bodies of Energy Systems as a board member or as a member of expert groups or as a consultant. , particularly in terms of consultancies, especially worth mentioning are SINTEX, Tata Consultancy Services, Punjab Agro Industries and Ronak Industries. He also acted as consultant to governmental and agencies as Ministry of Non-Conventional Energy resources, TATA Energy Research Institute, Swedish Energy Development agency, Ministry of Economic Cooperation, Germany and Planning Commission of India.

Personal life 
Narendra Kumar Bansal had a devoted wife, Shaila Bansal and three daughters, Shalini, Pooja and Sweta. Narendra believed in value of hard work, honesty and integrity. He was ahead of his times and wanted to make his daughters independent working women. He ensured that his daughters got the best education through Delhi Public School and later sent them to Arizona State University, United States for higher studies. While he wrote lot of books and dedicated his life to his career, his wife Shaila Bansal kept the house running, raised the kids and followed him to Germany and Jammu when he became the president of the university. She was always encouraging him to follow his dreams and achieve success. 
Shaila Bansal suffered through multiple cancers, including pancreatic cancer. Due to his scientific mindset, iron will and problem-solving skills, Bansal was able to find the right doctor and the right treatment and was able to prolong his wife's life for decades. While continuing to look after his wife, he actively remained involved in consulting and furthering his research in area of energy studies. 
Bansal served his family and extended family during his life. Due to central location of Delhi, Bansal and his wife Shaila, ensured during their lifetime that his parents got the medical attention they needed in the best hospitals including All India Medical Institute in Delhi.

Germany
Narendra Kumar Bansal had a long history of successful and deep collaboration with Germany. It started in 1975, when on a cold morning in December 1975 with high hopes and seven dollars in his pocket, he arrived in Karlsruhe for a student exchange program called DAAD. At the airport, he along with two other students were handed train vouchers to Freiburg, where they had to undergo a course in German language in the Goethe Institute. With just 7 dollars in their pocket, they tried to shorten the wait at the windy railway station with a cup of tea that cost them a Mark. When they reached Freiburg at 6 pm, and as it was Sunday since the Goethe Institute was closed for accommodation and money, they took a taxi to the youth hostel tired and hungry. When they went the next day to the Goethe Institute the seven dollars was already spent. After interrogation, they were sent to the police for interrogation. Returning from the police, they found that the cashier had already gone home. They had no money, so they had to walk to their arranged accommodation. The caretaker took mercy on the exhausted young man and let him in a room and offered a cup of tea.

Bansal joined the research center in Karlsruhe (FZK) on 1 April 1976. However, he visited FZK in February to meet his Chief Scientific Advisor and arrange an apartment for his family. At FZK he worked hard and published scientific papers and journals which boosted his self-esteem. But he also realized the work on nuclear safety would not be appropriate for university teachings in India. After returning to India in 1977, he started working vigorously in the field of solar energy.

Soon, he returned to Germany this time at the research center Juelich in the field of Solar Energy. He did very extensive work in the field of solar thermal technologies, energy efficient buildings, and energy economics planning. He wrote a book "The climate zones of India and Passive Building Design: A handbook of Natural Climate Control" with G. Minke and G. Hauser that became the standard work in this field.

On a number of occasions, Bansal was invited to the Aachen Polytechnic as well as the universities of Essen, Kassel and Siegen. All his teachings were in German and he talked as a native German speaker. Professor Michael Meliss who joined polytechnic in Aachen at the research center Juelich, formed an institutional working group "Solar and other renewable technologies". The federal state of Northern Rheinland, Westfalia funded the working group. An advisory board was established, and Dr. Bansal was elected to the Scientific Advisory Board. His various visits to Germany and his numerous projects in solar photovoltaic, energy and environmental analysis were funded by the German Ministry of Research and Technology. He became a close friend of Meliss and his family and regarded him as a brother. He had developed really close relationships that lasted many decades including Dr. Clayman, Mr. Minke, Dr. Spate, Mr. Balbir Goel to name a few. Bansal was highly regarded, and lot of German students visited India during his tenure at the Indian Institute of Technology.

Students
Bansal had over 35 PHD students. His students Jytoirmay Mathur, Vishal Garg, Adil, Mahabir Bhandari, Rajesh Mathur went on to establish successful careers in the field of energy and environment. Bansal also brought lot of students from Germany to India and exposed them to the environmental challenges and techniques. He lectured in German at various universities in Germany.

Some of the excerpts from his students is demonstrated below:
 'His impact is going to be felt in the generations to come over the next 40 to 50 years'
 'We are who we are due to Prof. Bansal. We could have been nothing without him – Adil and Jytoirmay'

Bansal's students plan to start a memorial lecture series in his honor in 2021. A new book written by his students Building Energy Simulation, has been dedicated to Narendra Bansal.

Late life 
After completing an extremely successful tenure in Vaishno Devi, Professor Bansal returned to Delhi and he was invited by the Ministry of New and Renewable Energy, Govt. of India as HR consultant to develop course curriculum for all national institutions at various levels. Simultaneously, he was provided an industry chair, SINTEX Chair Professor, at CEPT University Ahmedabad with the flexibility of operating from Delhi. Professor continued to guide the policy level organizations, universities and the industries until his death on 4 February 2020.
Bansal was working till the very end of his life. He retired in May, 2019 from Sintex. As his wife's condition deteriorated and when she died on 24 October 2019, from cancer, Bansal was heartbroken. He also suffered spinal injury and later developed Pneumonia in January 2020. He was admitted to Max Saket and was later put on ventilator. He died after 4 days on ventilator on 4 February 2020.

References

External links

Academic staff of IIT Delhi
1943 births
2020 deaths
People from Bundi